The yellow-tailed woolly monkey (Lagothrix flavicauda) is a New World monkey endemic to Peru. It is a rare primate species found only in the Peruvian Andes, in the departments of Amazonas and San Martin, as well as bordering areas of La Libertad, Huánuco, and Loreto.

Taxonomy 
The yellow-tailed woolly monkey was at first classified in the genus Lagothrix along with other woolly monkeys, but due to debatable primary sources, it was later placed in its own monotypic genus, Oreonax. Oreonax has been proposed to be a subgenus of Lagothrix, but others have regarded it as a full genus. A recent extensive study suggests that the yellow-tailed woolly monkey indeed belongs in Lagothrix, which has been followed by the American Society of Mammalogists and the IUCN Red List.

Discovery and rediscovery
The species was first described by Alexander von Humboldt in 1812 under the name Simia flavicauda, based on a skin found 10 years earlier, used by a local man as a horse saddle. Humboldt had never seen a live animal of this species nor a preserved specimen, and believed it belonged to the genus Alouatta. For over 100 years, the species was reported on only a few isolated occasions, so was thought to be extinct.

In 1926, three specimens were collected in San Martin, which were then brought to the Museum of Natural History. They were believed to be of a new species, but further evidence made it clear that these specimens were of the yellow-tailed woolly monkey.

In 1974, a group of scientists, led by Russell Mittermeier, and funded by World Wide Fund for Nature, found a young yellow-tailed woolly monkey which was kept as a pet in the city of Pedro Ruiz Gallo, Amazonas. The rediscovery attracted the attention of national and international press, as well as conservation organizations that saw the need to know quickly the status of this species.

In the summer of 2004, scientists searched for yellow-tailed woolly monkeys in a remote area of San Martin, where the forest is tropical, humid, and quite mountainous. The forest area, threatened due to haphazard tree cutting, was believed to have at least a minor population of the species, and was studied along with two other areas of Peru.

The loss of habitat due to the tree cutting in the yellow-tailed woolly monkey habitat could prove problematic for the species as a whole. The introduction of farm plots in regions where this organism can be sustained is  impacting the yellow-tailed woolly. The farmers of Peru are afraid of losing their farmland to conservation efforts. Farmers said that they did not hunt the monkeys, but that the land is necessary for growing coffee and raising cattle. The balance between avoiding the extinction of the species and maintaining the livelihood of the farmers of Peru is a major issue in the struggle for conservation efforts toward the yellow-tailed woolly monkey.

Description
Oreonax flavicauda is one of the rarest Neotropical primates and is one of Peru's largest endemic mammals. Adult head and body lengths can range from 51.3 to 53.5 cm, with tails even longer than the body, up to 63 cm (25 in). The average weight is 8 kg in adults, but some males reach 11.5 kg. Peruvian yellow-tailed woolly monkeys are similar in size to the common woolly monkey, also in the genus Lagothrix. They live in large social groups (around 23 individuals) of both male and females. They have low reproductive rates and long interbirth intervals, which adds to their vulnerability for extinction. They are known to express aggressive behaviors upon initial encounters such as branch shaking, "mooning" of the scrotal tuft, and short barking calls. The yellow-tailed woolly monkeys' fur is longer and denser than other woolly monkeys, an adaptation to its cold montane forest habitat.  The monkey's color is deep mahogany and copper with a whitish patch on its snout extending from the chin to between its eyes. Its fur gets darker towards its upper body, making its head seem almost black. It has a powerful prehensile tail, with a hairless patch on its underside and a yellowish pelage on the last third of the tail, giving this species its name. This coloration of the tail is not seen in infants and juveniles. The powerful tail is capable of supporting the animal's entire body weight while feeding or just hanging around; it also uses its tail to help travel through the canopy. The monkey is also known for its long, yellowish, pubic hair tuft. It has the ability to leap 15 m (49 ft).

Habitat and distribution

The yellow-tailed woolly monkey is one of the least known of the primate species.  It is also one of the largest neotropical primates.  They are regularly found in the tropical Andes. Their habitat is characterized as rough terrain consisting of steep mountain sides and deep river gorges, with canopy heights of 20–25 m. Cloud forest, the habitat of this monkey, are in high altitudes and often have cloud coverage near or in them. The last estimated population count was less than 250 individuals.  The current habitat of the yellow-tailed monkey is fragmented due to deforestation, as is the population. This can hinder reproduction, as it limits an already limited population. The Yellow-Tailed monkey has never been subject to a full census so exact numbers vary. A study was done to exam the population however the terrain and fragmented populations made this difficult.

Its habitat is characterized by steep gorges and ravines.

Diet and natural history
Its diet is primarily frugivorous, but leaves, flowers, insects and other invertebrates are also eaten.
The species is arboreal and diurnal. It has a multiple-male group social system and a polygamous mating system. They have a variety of vocalisations, including a loud, "puppy-like" bark which they use as a territorial or alarm call.

Yellow-tailed woolly monkeys participate in geophagy, the consumption of soil. Geophagy is a rare biological behavior, but the species benefits since it results in trace mineral intake of minerals and reduction of intestinal parasites; they tend to suffer from an iron-deficient diet. Their consumption of soil allows them to intake iron that they do not get from their regular diet.

Conservation
The inaccessibility of its habitat protected the species until the 1950s. However, the construction of new roads, habitat loss and fragmentation from agriculture, logging and cattle ranching, and subsistence hunting, together with the monkey's naturally low population densities, slow maturation, and low reproductive rate, have led to a predicted decline of at least 80% over the next three generations. This and its restricted geographic distribution have led to this species' current critically endangered status.

Conservation work started soon after the species was rediscovered in the mid-1970s. This pioneering work by the Peruvian NGO APECO led to the creation of three protected areas, Rio Abiseo National Park, Alto Mayo Protected Forest, and Cordillera de Colán National Sanctuary. From the mid-1980s until recently, further conservation or research efforts were minimal. Starting in 2007, though, British NGO Neotropical Primate Conservation has been running conservation initiatives for the species throughout its range.

The species is considered one of "The World's 25 Most Endangered Primates".

Habitat loss by deforestation is the biggest threat to the endangerment of yellow-tailed woolly monkeys. The Lima-Tarapoto highway which runs through the regions of San Martin and Amazonas has caused the immigration of people from coastal and high mountain regions leading to overpopulation. Due to the negligence of the regional government of Shipasbamba, Amazonas to the accept requests for conservation efforts, local lands have been the victims of slash-and-burn agriculture by local farmers to support the growing demand of local agricultural crops, as well as to support the increase in population size. With the deforestation and increased population, the monkeys have had their habitat range reduced, which increases their risk of extinction. Conservation efforts led by ASPROCOT have been made recently to help protect the endangered monkeys by turning to alternative forms of agriculture to preserve the remnants of the Amazonas forests. However, a lack of funding has slowed the conservation process.

Several communities in Peru have made conservation efforts to preserve the yellow-tailed woolly monkeys through various ways. Community-based conservation efforts have been made in preserving the monkeys, such as in Los Chilchos valley, where the project is directed by the Apenheul Primate Conservation Trust. Efforts include preventing further immigration into areas home to the monkeys and beginning ecosystem protection initiatives. Neotropical Primate Conservation has begun using newly constructed roads in La Esperanza to access areas which are now being used to develop ecotourism initiatives to build awareness about the endangered monkey population and its habitat, which has helped local people understand the importance in preserving the monkeys and that the monkeys can be used as a valuable tourist attraction.

References

External links

 Animalinfo
 Primate Info Net Oreonax Factsheets
 Pictures of Oreonax Flavicauda.

yellow-tailed woolly monkey
EDGE species
Mammals of Peru
Endemic fauna of Peru
Mammals of the Andes
yellow-tailed woolly monkey
Taxobox binomials not recognized by IUCN
Taxa named by Alexander von Humboldt